Sir John Anthony Quayle  (7 September 1913 – 20 October 1989) was a British actor and theatre director. He was nominated for an Oscar and a Golden Globe for his supporting role as Thomas Wolsey in the film Anne of the Thousand Days (1969). He also played important roles in such major studio productions as The Guns of Navarone (1961), Lawrence of Arabia (1962), The Fall of the Roman Empire (1964), Operation Crossbow (1965), QB VII (1974) and The Eagle Has Landed (1976). Quayle was knighted in the 1985 New Years Honours List.

Early life
Quayle was born at 2, Delamere Road, Ainsdale, Southport, Lancashire, to solicitor Arthur Quayle, of a Manx family, and Esther Kate, née Overton.

He was educated at the private Abberley Hall School and Rugby School and trained at the Royal Academy of Dramatic Art (RADA) in London. After appearing in music hall, he joined the Old Vic in 1932. During World War II, he was a British Army officer and was made one of the area commanders of the Auxiliary Units in Northumberland.

Later he joined the Special Operations Executive (SOE) and served as a liaison officer with the partisans in Albania (reportedly, his service with the SOE seriously affected him, and he never felt comfortable talking about it). He described his experiences in a fictional form in Eight Hours from England.

He was an aide to the Governor of Gibraltar at the time of the air crash of General Władysław Sikorski's aircraft on 4 July 1943. He wrote of his Gibraltar experience in his second novel On Such a Night, published by Heinemann.

Career
From 1948 to 1956 Quayle directed at the Shakespeare Memorial Theatre, and laid the foundations for the creation of the Royal Shakespeare Company. His own Shakespearian roles included Falstaff, Othello, Benedick in Much Ado About Nothing, Henry VIII and Aaron in Titus Andronicus with Laurence Olivier; he played Mosca in Ben Jonson's Volpone; and he also appeared in contemporary plays. He played the role of Moses in Christopher Fry's play The Firstborn, in a production starring opposite Katharine Cornell. He also made an LP with Cornell, in which he played the role of poet Robert Browning in The Barretts of Wimpole Street.

His first film role was an uncredited brief appearance as an Italian wigmaker in Pygmalion (1938) – subsequent film roles included parts in Alfred Hitchcock's The Wrong Man, Michael Powell and Emeric Pressburger's The Battle of the River Plate (both 1956), Ice Cold in Alex (1958), Tarzan's Greatest Adventure (1959), The Guns of Navarone (1961), H.M.S. Defiant, David Lean's Lawrence of Arabia (both 1962) and The Fall of the Roman Empire (1964). He was nominated for an Academy Award for Best Supporting Actor for his role as Cardinal Wolsey in Anne of the Thousand Days (1969).

Often cast as the decent British officer, Quayle drew upon his own wartime experiences, bringing a degree of authenticity to the parts absent from the performances of some non-combatant stars. One of his best friends from his days at the Old Vic was fellow actor Alec Guinness, who appeared in several films with him. He was also a close friend of Jack Hawkins and Jack Gwillim; all four actors appeared in Lawrence of Arabia.

Quayle made his Broadway debut in The Country Wife in 1936. Thirty-four years later, he won critical acclaim for his starring role in the highly successful Anthony Shaffer play Sleuth, which earned him a Drama Desk Award.

Television appearances include the Armchair Theatre episode "The Scent of Fear" (1959) for ITV, the title role in the drama series Strange Report (ITC, 1969) and as French General Villers in the television film adaptation of The Bourne Identity (1988). He starred in the miniseries Masada (1981) as Rubrius Gallius. Also he narrated the BBC drama serial The Six Wives of Henry VIII (1970), and the acclaimed aviation documentary series Reaching for the Skies (1988). Quayle also starred in the 'Last Bottle in The World' episode of Tales of the Unexpected (TV series) 

Quayle was artist-in-residence at the University of Tennessee in the mid-70s. He came to Knoxville in spring 1974, through a partnership with the Kennedy Center, starring in Henry Denker's The Headhunters, which rehearsed and opened at the Clarence Brown Theatre and then moved on to the Kennedy Center's Eisenhower Theatre. Quayle was appointed as professor in theatre in 1974. He taught classes as an artist in residence and served as artistic director of the Clarence Brown Company—a professional theatre company in residence at UT. He played in Everyman the same year.

In 1984, he founded Compass Theatre Company, that he inaugurated with a tour of The Clandestine Marriage, directing and playing the part of Lord Ogleby. This production had a run at the Albery Theatre, London. With the same company he subsequently toured with a number of other plays, including Saint Joan, Dandy Dick and King Lear with himself in the title role.

Personal life
Quayle married twice. His first wife was the actress Hermione Hannen (1913–1983), to whom he was married from 1935 to 1941. In 1947, he married Dorothy Hyson (1914–1996), known as "Dot" to family and friends. He and Dorothy had two daughters, Jenny and Rosanna, and a son, Christopher.

Quayle died at his home in Chelsea from liver cancer on 20 October 1989.

Awards and honours
Awards (nominations)
 1959 – BAFTA Award for Best Actor in a Leading Role, for: Ice Cold in Alex
 1970 – Golden Globe Award for Best Supporting Actor – Motion Picture, for: Anne of the Thousand Days
 1970 – Academy Award for Best Supporting Actor, for: Anne of the Thousand Days
 1981 – Primetime Emmy Award for Outstanding Supporting Actor in a Limited Series or a Special, for: Masada
 1989 – CableACE Award for Best Actor in a Dramatic or Theatrical Special, for: The Theban Plays by Sophocles

Awards (won)
 1975 – Primetime Emmy Award for Outstanding Single Performance by a Supporting Actor in a Comedy or Drama Special, for: QB VII

Honours
Quayle was appointed a Commander of the Order of the British Empire (CBE) in the 1952 Birthday Honours and knighted in the 1985 New Year Honours for services to the Theatre.

Filmography

Film

Television

Books 
Quayle authored two novels and an autobiography.
 Eight Hours from England (novel) (1945, Heinemann)
 On Such a Night (novel) (1947, Heinemann)
 A Time to Speak (autobiography) (1990, Barrie & Jenkins)
The first novel is a semi-fictional account of his war service with the S.O.E. in Albania.

References

Further reading 
 Information on Quayle's war experience taken from  Howarth was an early member of SOE's HQ.
 The Wildest Province: SOE in the Land of the Eagle (2008), by Roderick Bailey, London: Cape.
 His autobiography: Time to Speak (1990)

External links

 
 
 Performances listed in Theatre Archive University of Bristol
 Anthony Quayle as director listed in Theatre Archive University of Bristol

1913 births
1989 deaths
Alumni of RADA
Outstanding Performance by a Supporting Actor in a Miniseries or Movie Primetime Emmy Award winners
English male film actors
English male stage actors
English male television actors
English male voice actors
Deaths from liver cancer
British Special Operations Executive personnel
People from Southport
Knights Bachelor
Actors awarded knighthoods
Commanders of the Order of the British Empire
English male Shakespearean actors
Royal Artillery officers
British Army personnel of World War II
Deaths from cancer in England
People educated at Rugby School
English people of Manx descent
20th-century English male actors
Royal Shakespeare Company members